Fritz Wächtler (born 13 October 1906, date of death unknown) was an Austrian figure skater. He competed in the pairs event at the 1936 Winter Olympics.

References

1906 births
Year of death missing
Austrian male pair skaters
Olympic figure skaters of Austria
Figure skaters at the 1936 Winter Olympics
Figure skaters from Vienna